Shinpei Fukuda (born 22 November 1987) is a Japanese road cyclist, who currently rides for UCI Continental team .

Major results
2007
 10th Tour de Okinawa
2008
 9th Overall Tour de Okinawa
2011
 1st Stage 1 Tour de Kumano
2013
 1st Stage 3 Tour de Ijen

References

External links

1987 births
Living people
Japanese male cyclists
People from Fujisawa, Kanagawa